The Capture is a 1950 American Western film directed by John Sturges and starring Lew Ayres and Teresa Wright.

The story, told in flashback deals with an ex-oil worker driven by guilt at causing the death of an innocent man to find out the truth about a robbery.

Plot
Lin Vanner is the manager of an oil company. The payroll has been stolen in a holdup. His fiancée urges him to pursue the suspect in hope that he will gain recognition. Deducing the road the robber may have taken over the border with Mexico, he sets out to intercept him. He shoots a man who shouts back at him and does not raise his hands when challenged by Lin.

Too late Lin learns that the man could not raise one arm because it was injured and this was the reason for his shouting rather than complying with the demand he raise his hands; he was not guilty of the robbery. Troubled by his action and abandoned by his fiancée, Lin takes it on himself to tell the dead man's wife, Ellen, but is mistaken for an applicant for a helper to keep the dead man's farm going until his widow's son is old enough to take over.

Lin believes that this opportunity has been given to him to make amends for his mistake.

With Father Gomez at his side, the story that he is being pursued by the police for another killing is told in a flashback.

Cast
 Lew Ayres as Lin Vanner
 Teresa Wright as Ellen
 Victor Jory as Father Gomez
 Jacqueline White as Luana Ware
 Jimmy Hunt as Ellen's son
 Barry Kelley  as Earl C. Mahoney
 Duncan Renaldo as Carlos
 William Bakewell as Tolin
 Milton Parsons as Thin Man
 Frank Matts as Juan 
 Felipe Turich as Valdez
 Edwin Rand as Sam Tevlin

Reception

Critical response
When the film was released, the staff at Variety gave the film a generally favorable review, writing "The Capture is an offbeat drama, with psychological overtones, that plays off against the raw and rugged background of Mexican locales.  Picture kicks off with a wallop ... Ayres and Teresa Wright are very capable in the lead characters, adding to the general realism given the story because of the locales used.  One of the interesting touches to the film is the incidental native music hauntingly spotted with the appearance of a blind guitar player."

See also
 List of films in the public domain in the United States

References

Notes

Bibliography

 American Film Institute. AFI Catalog of Motion Pictures Produced in the United States, Volume 1. The Capture, p. 378. University of California Press, 1971. .
 Howard Reid, John Howard. Movie Westerns:Hollywood Films the Wild, Wild West. The Capture, p. 45. Lulu.com, 2005. .
 Selby, Spencer. Dark City: The Film Noir. Jefferson, North Carolina: McFarland Publishing, 1984. .

External links

 
 
 
 
 
 
  (film in public domain)

1950 films
American Western (genre) films
1950 Western (genre) films
American black-and-white films
Films directed by John Sturges
RKO Pictures films
Films scored by Daniele Amfitheatrof
1950s English-language films
1950s American films